David Wilson (17 December 1908 – 22 February 1992) was an English footballer who played for Hamilton Academical and Stranraer as a centre forward.

Career
He finished as the top scorer in the Scottish Football League Division One in the 1936–37 season, with 34 goals. This remains the highest single-season total ever recorded for Hamilton Academical. He scored 246 league goals in 11 seasons prior to the Second World War (and over 400 in 17 years when all cups and unofficial wartime matches are counted), leading to him being described as the club's best ever player, and featured for Accies in the 1935 Scottish Cup Final which they lost 2–1 to Rangers.

Wilson was never selected for his native England, nor for the Scottish Football League XI despite his scoring feats in that competition. In June 1935 he toured North America with an SFA squad, scoring eleven times in six matches (all of which are considered unofficial by Scotland, although two appearances came against the USA, whose federation did regard the matches as official).

See also
List of footballers in Scotland by number of league goals (200+)

References

1908 births
1992 deaths
Association football forwards
English footballers
Hamilton Academical F.C. players
People from Hebburn
Scottish Football League players
Stranraer F.C. players
Scottish league football top scorers
Footballers from Tyne and Wear